Columbia/Epic Label Group was an American record label group, owned by Sony Music Entertainment. The Columbia/Epic configuration began as the "Sony Music Label Group" during the last year of the Sony BMG merger, and was restructured in 2009 to form a larger umbrella for Columbia Records and Epic Records (as well as their various affiliated labels) to continue to operate. The group also comprises Aware Records, and Daylight Records, while also handling the distribution of E1 Music via Epic Records.  Additionally, in conjunction with Legacy Recordings, it also manages the back catalogs of American Recording Company, Portrait Records and Private-I Records. The Columbia/Epic Label Group ended the year 2010 with the largest album market share among all label groups with a 10.96 share, according to The Nielsen Company. Rob Stringer acted as the CEO/Chairman of the company.

The Columbia/Epic Label Group was split in half in July 2011, when Doug Morris became the new head of Sony Music. Epic Records was separated and is now headed by L.A. Reid. This ultimately lead Columbia to being a stand-alone label under Sony Music.

Labels and artists

See also 
 List of record labels
 Sony Music Entertainment
 RCA/Jive Label Group

References

External links 
 Official site
 Columbia Records
 Epic Records

Record labels established in 2009
American record labels
Columbia Records
Epic Records
Record labels disestablished in 2011